The Tri-County Athletic Association (TCAA) is a high school athletic conference in California affiliated with the CIF Southern Section. Established in 2006, the association is an amalgamation of the Tri-Valley League and the Frontier League. The TCAA uses a system of promotion and relegation to place each school's teams, by sport and gender, into either league for a two-year period based on performance. As of the 2018–19 school year, the association is composed primarily of private schools located in Santa Barbara and Ventura counties.

In 2018, five public-school members of the TCAA left to form the Citrus Coast League. Santa Clara High School, a private Catholic school, also joined that league for football only.

Member schools
 Bishop Diego High School (2006–present; joined Marmonte League in 2014 for football)
 Cate School (2014–present)
 Foothill Technology High School (2014–present)
 Grace Brethren High School (2006–present; joined Marmonte League in 2014 for football)
 La Reina High School (2006–present)
 Providence School (2018–present)
 Santa Clara High School (2006–present; joined Citrus Coast League in 2018 for football)
 St. Bonaventure High School (2006–present; joined Marmonte League in 2010 for football)
 Thacher School (2014–present)
 Villanova Preparatory School (2006–present)
 Laguna Blanca School (2017–present)
 Dunn School, Los Olivos (2019–present)

Former members
Carpinteria High School (2006–2018; joined Citrus Coast League)
Fillmore High School (2006–2018; joined Citrus Coast League)
Malibu High School (2006–2018; joined Citrus Coast League)
Nordhoff High School (2006–2018; joined Citrus Coast League)
Oak Park High School (2006–2014; joined Coastal Canyon League)
Oaks Christian School (2006–2014; joined Marmonte League in 2010 for football and 2014 for all other sports)
Santa Paula High School (2006–2018; joined Citrus Coast League)

Sports
The Tri-County Athletic Association sponsors the following sports:

Fall season
Cross country
Girls' volleyball
Girls' tennis

Girls' golf

Winter season
Basketball
Soccer
Girls' water polo
Wrestling

Spring season
Baseball
Boys' golf
Softball
Swimming and diving
Boys' tennis
Track and field
Boys' volleyball

Notes

References

CIF Southern Section leagues
Sports in Santa Barbara County, California
Sports in Ventura County, California